The South Newport River is a  river on the Atlantic coastal plain in the U.S. state of Georgia. It flows into Sapelo Sound, an arm of the Atlantic Ocean, south of St. Catherines Island.

The river's name most likely is a transfer from Newport, Rhode Island.

See also
List of rivers of Georgia

References 

Rivers of Georgia (U.S. state)
Rivers of Long County, Georgia
Rivers of Liberty County, Georgia
Rivers of McIntosh County, Georgia